Halsbury’s Law Exchange is a legal think tank based in the United Kingdom.

Aims and Objectives 
The think tank states that it aims to contribute to the development of law and the legal sector; to communicate ideas on reform and legal direction to decision-makers and the legal sector; and to promote debate through papers, reports, events, and media pieces. The outfit aims to examine the rule of law, the structure of the legal system, and the development of the legal sector to contribute to the development of an efficient statutory framework to comment on current legal issues that impact society, and to put forward proposals to ensure the law is just.

Research and Publications

Recent White Papers 
Environment: International environmental problems are in a legal lacuna; is an international court for the environment now an imperative?

Corporate: Missed opportunities: did the UK miss a significant opportunity to implement important improving reforms in the recent re-write of its companies’ legislation? Should it now be making further advances, thus parting with old traditions in favour of supporting modern corporate practices?

Recent Research 
Employment: A proposal for a simpler employee vetting system.

Family: Does media access to family courts herald a new and potentially damaging era of openness in family proceedings?

Assisted dying: Proposals to change UK law and advance some suitable conclusions for adoption in this jurisdiction.

Sovereign immunity: A white paper questioning whether the doctrine of sovereign immunity is still appropriate.

External links 
 http://www.lexisnexis.co.uk/
 http://www.lnbconnect.co.uk/
 http://www.newlawjournal.co.uk/nlj/http://www.criminallawandjustice.co.uk/
 http://www.lawbusinessreview.co.uk/

Members 
 Joshua Rozenberg
 Khawar Qureshi QC – Commercial and International Law
 Tim Pitt Payne – Information Law – Freedom of Information, Data Protection (also Employment)
 John Cooper QC – Serious Crime
 Nigel Boardman – Corporate
 Tony Williams – Legal Sector Strategy
 Lucy Theis QC – Family
 Stephen Hockman QC – Environment
 David Greene – Commercial Litigation
 Professor Ian Smith – Employment
 Jonathan Cooper OBE – Human Rights
 Declan O'Dempsey – Employment/Regulatory
 Owen Davies QC – Serious Crime/Extradition/Human Rights/The Bar
 Nick Jarrett Kerr – Strategy/Client Relationship Management

Legal think tanks
Think tanks based in the United Kingdom